The Société Anonyme de Travaux Dyle et Bacalan was formed in 1879 by the merger of the Belgian Ateliers de la Dyle and Ateliers and Chantiers de Bacalan which had emerged from the bankruptcy of the Arman Brothers shipyard in 1867. The company entered the aviation market during the 1920s and merged with Ateliers et Chantiers du Sud-Ouest in 1930 to form Ateliers et Chantiers du Sud-Ouest et de Bacalan Reunis, while spinning off its aviation activities as the Société Aérienne Bordelaise. The combined company closed its doors in 1936.

Among other endeavors, the company acquired the rights to build the Curitiba-Paranaguá railway line, executing its construction from 1870 to 1875 with the direction of Antonio Ferrucci and later of João Teixeira Soares, through the Compagnie Génerale des Chemins de Fer Brésiliens.

Bibliography

References

Shipyards of France
Bordeaux
1936 disestablishments in France
 
French companies established in 1879